"Ain't No Rest for the Wicked" is the third single by the American rock band Cage the Elephant. It was released as a CD single on June 16, 2008 by Relentless Records and became the first Top 40 hit for the band in the UK. A music video was filmed for this song which was directed by D.A.R.Y.L of Pulse Films. A later re-release in North America the following year reached number 92 on the Billboard Hot 100, reached number 3 on the Alternative Songs chart and number 8 on the Mainstream Rock Tracks chart.

Composition

The song talks about three particular instances in which the narrator realizes "there ain't no rest for the wicked." First, he encounters a prostitute asking if he desires to spend the night with her. The narrator proceeds to ask her why she does what she does. The chorus (her response) analyzes the main reasons why individuals follow the paths they follow ("...Money don't grow on trees, I've got bills to pay, I've got mouths to feed..."). The narrator, less than fifteen minutes later, is mugged by a criminal, whom he asks the same question and from whom he receives the same answer. Finally, upon arriving home and turning on the television, the narrator sees a preacher being arrested for stealing the funds of his church. This is followed by a third chorus saying that everyone is the same and we all have no rest "until we close our eyes for good."

Lead singer Matt Shultz stated the song was inspired by an old co-worker of his who at the time was a drug dealer. When Shultz asked him why he dealt drugs, the co-worker told him that "There's no rest for the wicked."  Shultz was a plumber at the time, and said that he wrote the lyrics on a piece of drywall which he found while working at his co-worker's house.

Usage in media
The song appeared in the opening and closing sequences of the first Borderlands game; a commercial for the TNT series Leverage;  in the 2010 film The Bounty Hunter; in an episode of The Vampire Diaries ("Isobel"); in a third-season episode of Jersey Shore; as the opening song of Canadian reality television series Yukon Gold; and  Cage the Elephant performed the song on national television on the Late Show with David Letterman. In the pilot episode for Fox's Lucifer, the song is in both the opening and closing scenes of the episode. It was also used in the Netflix series 13 Reasons Why and in Hawaii Five-0.

Track listings
 "Ain't No Rest for the Wicked" – 2:52
 "Ain't No Rest for the Wicked" (Acoustic Version) – 3:02

Charts

Weekly charts

Year-end charts

Certifications

References

External links

2008 singles
Cage the Elephant songs
Songs about prostitutes
Songs critical of religion
Song recordings produced by Jay Joyce
Relentless Records singles
2008 songs
Songs written by Matt Shultz (singer)